Stephanie Peacock may refer to:
 Stephanie Peacock (born 1986), British politician
 Stephanie Peacock (swimmer) (born 1992), American swimmer